The Soviet Union's 1953 nuclear test series was a group of 5 nuclear tests conducted in 1953. These tests followed the 1949-51 Soviet nuclear tests series and preceded the 1954 Soviet nuclear tests series.

References

1953
1953 in the Soviet Union
1953 in military history
Explosions in 1953
August 1953 events in Asia
September 1953 events in Asia